Following a recent tradition, the women's 10 metre air rifle competition was the first medal event concluded at the 2000 Summer Olympics. It was held on 16 September, the day after the opening ceremony, with the 40-shot qualification round between 09:00 and 10:15 Australian Eastern Standard Time (UTC+10), and the final round of 10 additional shots at 11:00. Kang Cho-hyun equalled the Olympic record in the qualification round but lost her two-point pre-final lead to Nancy Johnson, who thus won the first Sydney gold medal for the United States.

Records
The existing World and Olympic records were as follows.

Qualification round

−2p 2 points deducted (scoring protest turned down) – EOR Equalled Olympic record – Q Qualified for final

Final

References

Sources

Shooting at the 2000 Summer Olympics
Olymp
Women's events at the 2000 Summer Olympics